John C. Stewart was a Republican member of the Michigan House of Representatives from 2001 through 2006 representing a portion of Wayne County.

Prior to his election to the House, Stewart was an attorney in private practice in Plymouth. He also served as a trustee of Plymouth Township for one term, from 1988 to 1992. He was re-elected in 2020, and is now serving another term expiring in 2024.

References

Living people
1949 births
People from Wyandotte, Michigan
Republican Party members of the Michigan House of Representatives